A large number of books and articles have been written on the subject of suburbs and suburban living as a regional, national or worldwide phenomenon. This is a selected bibliography of scholarly and analytical works, listed by subject region and focus.

Europe
 Archer, John.  Architecture and Suburbia: From English Villa to American Dream House, 1690–2000. University of Minnesota Press, 2005.
 Boulton, Jeremy. Neighbourhood and Society: A London Suburb in the Seventeenth Century  (Cambridge Studies in Population, Economy and Society in Past Time) (2005) 
 Dyos, Harold James. Victorian suburb;: A study of the growth of Camberwell (1966) 
 Galinou, Mireille. Cottages and Villas: The Birth of the Garden Suburb (2011) 
 Jordan, Christine. Illustrated History of Leicester's Suburbs (2003) 
 Kuchta, Todd. Semi-Detached Empire: Suburbia and the Colonization of Britain, 1880 to the Present (2010)
 Robey, Ann et al. Rediscovered Utopias: Saving London's Suburbs (2010) 
 Vaughan, Laura et al. Suburban Urbanities. UCL Press (2015) Available free from https://dx.doi.org/10.14324/111.9781910634134
 Wilks, John. Walks Through History - Birmingham: Edgbaston: the creation of luxury suburbia (2011)

Canada
 Harris, Richard. Unplanned Suburbs: Toronto's American Tragedy, 1900 to 1950 (1999) 
 Harris, Richard. Creeping Conformity: How Canada Became Suburban, 1900-1960 (2004) 
 Lewis, Robert.  Manufacturing Montreal: The Making of an Industrial Landscape, 1850 to 1930.  Johns Hopkins University Press, 2001.
 Lorimer, James, and Evelyn Ross. The Second City Book: Studies of Urban and Suburban Canada (1977) 
 Morton, Suzanne. Ideal Surroundings: Domestic Life in a Working-Class Suburb in the 1920s (Studies in Gender and History) (1995)
 Whitzman, Carolyn. Suburb, Slum, Urban Village: Transformations in Toronto's Parkdale Neighbourhood, 1875-2002 (2010)

United States

Surveys
 Baxandall, Rosalyn and Elizabeth Ewen. Picture Windows:  How the Suburbs Happened. New York:  Basic Books, 2000.
 Beauregard, Robert A.  When America Became Suburban.  University of Minnesota Press, 2006.
 Bruegmann, Robert. Sprawl: A Compact History.  University of Chicago Press, 2005.
 Duany, Andrés and Elizabeth Plater-Zyberk. Suburban Nation: The Rise of Sprawl and the Decline of the American Dream. North Point Press, 2000.
 Fishman, Robert.  Bourgeois Utopias: The Rise and Fall of Suburbia.  Basic Books, 1987.
 Gardner, Todd.  “The Slow Wave: The Changing Residential Status of Cities and Suburbs in the United States, 1850–1949.”  Journal of Urban History 27, no. 3 (March 2001): 293–312.
 Hanlon, Bernadette, John Rennie Short and Thomas J. Vicino. Cities and Suburbs: New Metropolitan Realities in the U.S. Routledge, 2010.
 Harris, Richard and Robert Lewis.  “The Geography of North American Cities and Suburbs, 1900–1950: A New Synthesis.”  Journal of Urban History 27, no. 3 (March 2001): 262–92.
 Hayden, Dolores.  Building Suburbia: Green Fields and Urban Growth, 1820–2000.  Vintage Books, 2003.
 
 Muller, Peter O.  Contemporary Suburban America. Prentice–Hall, 1981.
 Mumford, Lewis.  The Culture of Cities.  Harcourt Brace, 1938.
 Mumford, Lewis.  “Suburbia — and Beyond.”  In The City in History: Its Origins, Its Transformations, and Its Prospects, by Lewis Mumford, 483–503.  Harcourt, Brace & World, 1961.
 Nicolaides, Becky M. and Andrew Weise, editors.  The Suburb Reader.  Routledge, 2006.
 Palen, J. John.  The Suburbs.  McGraw–Hill, 1995.
 Stilgoe, John R.  Borderland: Origins of the American Suburb, 1820–1939.  Yale University Press, 1989.
 Teaford, Jon C.  The American Suburb: The Basics.  Routledge, 2008.
 Teaford, Jon C. The Metropolitan Revolution: The Rise of Post-Urban America (2006)

Specialized studies
 Archer, John.  Architecture and Suburbia: From English Villa to American Dream House, 1690–2000. Minneapolis: University of Minnesota Press, 2005.
 Archer, John.  “Country and City in the American Romantic Suburb.”  The Journal of the Society of Architectural Historians 42, no. 2 (May 1983): 139–56.
 Baldassare, Mark.  Trouble in Paradise: The Suburban Transformation in America.  New York: Columbia University Press, 1986.
 Baumgartner, M. P.  The Moral Order of a Suburb.  New York:  Oxford University Press, 1988.
 Binford, Henry C.  The First Suburbs: Residential Communities on the Boston Periphery, 1815–1860.  Chicago: University of Chicago Press, 1985.
 Blakely, Edward J. and Mary Gail Snyder.  Fortress America:  Gated Communities in the United States.  Washington, D.C.:  Brookings Institution, 1997.
 Blauvelt, Andrew, ed. Worlds Away: New Suburban Landscapes.  Walker Art Center, 2008.
 Conn, Steven and Max Page, editors.  Building the Nation: Americans Write About Their Architecture, Their Cities, and Their Landscape.  University of Pennsylvania Press, 2003.
 Crawford, Margaret.  Building the Workingman’s Paradise: The Design of American Company Towns.  Verso, 1995.
 Davis, Mike.  City of Quartz: Excavating the Future in Los Angeles.  London: Verso, 1990.
 Donoghue, John.  Alexander Jackson Davis, Romantic Architect, 1803–1892.  New York: Arno Press, 1977.
 Douglass, Harlan Paul.  The Suburban Trend.  1925. 
 Downs, Jr., Arthur Channing.  “Downing’s Newburgh Villa.”  Bulletin of the Association for Preservation Technology 4, nos. 3–4 (1972): 1–113.
 Ebner, Michael H.  Creating Chicago’s North Shore: A Suburban History.  Chicago: University of Chicago Press, 1988.
 Flint, Anthony.  This Land: The Battle Over Sprawl and the Future of America.  Johns Hopkins University Press, 2006.
 Fogelson, Robert M.  Bourgeois Nightmares:  Suburbia, 1870–193'''.  Yale University Press, 2005.
 Garreau, Joel.  Edge City: Life on the New Frontier.  New York: Doubleday, 1991.
 Gruenberg, Sidonie Matsner. "The Challenge of the New Suburbs." Marriage and Family Living 17, no. 2 (May 1955): 133–37.
 Hanlon, Bernadette.Once the American Dream: Inner ring Suburbs of the Metropolitan United States. Philadelphia: Temple University Press, 2010.
 Harris, Richard and Robert Lewis.  “Constructing a Fault(y) Zone: Misrepresentations of American Cities and Suburbs, 1900–1950.”  Annals of the Association of American Geographers 88, no. 4 (1998): 622–41.
 Hayden, Dolores.  Building Suburbia:  Green Fields and Urban Growth, 1920–2000.  New York: Pantheon Books, 2003.
 Henderson, Susan.  “Llewellyn Park, Suburban Idyll.”  Journal of Garden History 7, no. 3 (July–September 1987): 221–43.
 Hise, Greg.  Magnetic Los Angeles: Planning the Twentieth-Century Metropolis.  Johns Hopkins University Press, 1997.
 Hope, Andrew.  "Evaluation the Significance of San Lorenzo Village, A Mid-20th Century Suburban Community."  CRM:  The Journal of Heritage Stewardship 2 (Summer 2005): 50–61.
 Hope, Andrew. "Evaluation the Significance of San Lorenzo Village, A Mid-20th Century Suburban Community." CRM: The Journal of Heritage Stewardship 2 (Summer 2005): 50–61.
 Jackson, John Brinckerhoff.  Discovering the Vernacular Landscape.  Yale University Press, 1984.
 Jacobs, Jane.  Dark Age Ahead.  Random House, 2004.
 Kargon, Robert Hugh and Arthur P. Molella.  Invented Edens: Techno-Cities of the Twentieth Century.  MIT Press, 2008.
 Katz, Bruce and Robert E. Lang, editors.  Redefining Urban and Suburban America: Evidence from Census 2000.  Brookings, 2003.
 Katz, Peter, editor.  The New Urbanism: Toward an Architecture of Community.  Afterword by Vincent Scully.  McGraw–Hill, 1994.
 Kay, Jane Holtz.  Asphalt Nation: How the Automobile took over America, and How We Can Take it Back.  Crown Publishers, 1997.
 Keating, Ann Durkin.  Building Chicago: Suburban Developers and the Creation of a Divided Metropolis.  Ohio State University Press, 1988.
 Kelly, Barbara.  Expanding the American Dream: Building and Rebuilding Levittown.  State University of Albany Press, 1993.
 Low, Setha.  Behind the Gates: Life, Security, and the Pursuit of Happiness in Fortress America.  New York: Routledge, 2003.
 Lukez, Paul.  Suburban Transformations.  New York: Princeton Architectural Press, 2007.
 Mattingly, Paul H.  Suburban Landscapes: Culture and Politics in a New York Metropolitan Community.  Johns Hopkins University Press, 2001.
 McKenzie, Evan.  Privatopia: Homeowner Associations and the Rise of Residential Private Government.  New Haven, Conn.: Yale University Press, 1994.
 Morton, Marian. "The Suburban Ideal and Suburban Realities: Cleveland Heights, Ohio, 1860–2001." Journal of Urban History 28, no. 5 (September 2002) 671–98.
 Nicolaides, Becky M.  My Blue Heaven: Life and Politics in the Working-Class Suburbs of Los Angeles, 1920–1965.  University of Chicago Press, 2002.
 O'Connell, James C. The Hub's Metropolis: Greater Boston's Development From Railroad Suburbs to Smart Growth (MIT Press; 2013) 326 pages
 O'Toole, Randall. "The Vanishing Automobile and Other Urban Myths" The Thoreau Institute.
 Orfield, Myron.  American Metropolitics: The New Suburban Reality.  Brookings Institution Press, 2002.
 Russell, James S.  “When Suburbs Become Mega-Suburbs.”  Architectural Record 191, no. 8 (August 2003): 76–81.
 Rybczynski, Witold (November 7, 2005). "Suburban Despair". Slate.
 Rybczynski, Witold.  "How to Build a Suburb."  The Wilson Quarterly 19 no. 3 (Summer 2005):  114–126.
 Salamon, Sonya.  Newcomers to Old Towns: Suburbanization of the Heartland.  University of Chicago Press, 2003.
 Sandul, Paul J. P. California Dreaming: Boosterism, Memory, and Rural Suburbs in the Golden State. West Virginia University Press, 2014.
 Schuyler, David.  Apostle of Taste: Andrew Jackson Downing, 1815–1852.  Johns Hopkins University Press, 1996.
 Schuyler, David.  The New Urban Landscape: The Redefinition of Form in Nineteenth-Century America.  Johns Hopkins University Press, 1986.
 Sies, Mary Corbin.  “The City Transformed: Nature, Technology, and the Suburban Ideal, 1877–1917.”  Journal of Urban History 14, no. 1 (November 1987): 81–111.
 Sies, Mary Corbin. American Urban History: The Everyday Politics and Spatial Logics of Metropolitan Life.”  Urban History Review/Revue d’histoire 32, no. 1 (Fall 2003): 28–42.
 Sies, Mary Corbin. “Paradise Retained: An Analysis of Persistence in Planned, Exclusive Suburbs, 1880–1980.”  Planning Perspectives 12 (1997): 165–91.
 Smith, Albert C. & Schank, Kendra (1999). "A Grotesque Measure for Marietta". Journal of Urban Design 4 (3).
 Stevens, William K.  “Beyond the Mall: Suburbs Evolving into ‘Outer City.’”  New York Times, November 8, 1987, E5.
 Sweeting, Adam W.  Reading Houses and Building Books: Andrew Jackson Downing and the Architecture of Popular Antebellum Literature, 1835–1855.  University Press of New England, 1996.
 Tatum, George B. and Elisabeth Blair MacDougall, editors.  Prophet with Honor: The Career of Andrew Jackson Downing, 1815–1852.  Dumbarton Oaks Colloquium on the History of Landscape Architecture.  Washington, D.C.: Dumbarton Oaks Research Library and Collection, 1989.
 Walker, Richard and Robert Lewis.  “Beyond the Crabgrass Frontier: Industry and the Spread of North American Cities, 1850–1950.”  Journal of Historical Geography 27, no. 1 (January 2001): 3–19.
 Warner, Jr., Sam Bass.  Streetcar Suburbs: The Process of Growth in Boston, 1870–1900.  1962.  
 Wilson, Richard Guy.  “Idealism and the Origin of the First American Suburb: Llewellyn Park, New Jersey.”  American Art Journal (October 1979): 79–90.
 Jackson, Kenneth T..  "All the World's a Mall:  Reflections on the Social and Economic Consequences of the American Shopping Center."  The American Historical Review 101 no. 4 (October 1996):  1111–1121.
 Wright, Gwendolyn.  Building the Dream: A Social History of Housing in America.  Pantheon Books, 1981.
 von Hoffman, Alexander.  Local Attachments: The Making of an American Urban Neighborhood, 1850–1920.  Johns Hopkins University Press, 1994.

Women, family, lifestyles and images
 Clark, Jr., Clifford Edward.  The American Family Home, 1800–1960.  University of North Carolina Press, 1986.
 Coon, David R. Look Closer: Suburban Narratives and American Values in Film and Television )Rutgers University Press; 2013) 269 pages; explores the critical image of suburbia in such films and TV shows as American Beauty, The Truman Show, Mr. & Mrs. Smith, Desperate Housewives, Weeds, and Big Love.
 Friedan, Betty.  The Feminine Mystique.  Norton, 1963.
 Marsh, Margaret.  Suburban Lives.  Rutgers University Press, 1990.
 Marsh, Margaret. "Suburban Men and Masculine Domesticity.”  American Quarterly 40, no. 2 (June 1988): 165–86.
 Murray, Sylvie.  The Progressive Housewife: Community Activism in Suburban Queens.  University of Pennsylvania Press, 2004.
 Putman, Robert D.  Bowling Alone: The Collapse and Revival of American Community.  Simon & Schuster, 2000.
 Whyte, Jr., William H.  The Organization Man.  Simon and Schuster, 1956.
 Wright, Gwendolyn.  Moralism and the Model Home: Domestic Architecture and Cultural Conflict in Chicago, 1870–1913.  University of Chicago Press, 1980

Race
 Avila, Eric.  Popular Culture in the Age of White Flight: Fear and Fantasy in Suburban Los Angeles.  Berkeley: University of California Press, 2004.
 Greason, Walter D. "Suburban Erasure: How the Suburbs Ended the Civil Rights Movement in New Jersey". Madison: Fairleigh Dickinson University Press, 2013.
 Fong, Timothy P.  The First Suburban Chinatown: The Remaking of Monterey Park, California.  Philadelphia: Temple University Press, 1994.
 Haynes, Bruce D.  Red Lines, Black Spaces: The Politics of Race and Space in a Black Middle-Class Suburb.  New Haven: Yale University Press, 2001.
 Johnson, Ronald M.  “From Romantic Suburb to Racial Enclave: LeDroit Park, Washington, D.C., 1880–1920.”  Phylon 45, no. 4 (4th Quarter 1984): 264–70.
 Kalita, S. Mitra.  Suburban Sahibs: Three Immigrant Families and Their Passage from India to America.  Rutgers University Press, 2003.
 Kirp, David L., John P. Dwyer, and Larry A. Rosenthal  Our Town: Race, Housing, and the Soul of Suburbia.  Rutgers University Press, 1995.
 Kruse, Kevin M.  White Flight: Atlanta and the Making of Modern Conservatism.  Princeton University Press, 2005.
 Li, Wei.  “Building Ethnoburbia: The Emergence and Manifestation of the Chinese Ethnoburb in Los Angeles’ San Gabriel Valley.”  Journal of Asian American Studies 2, no. 1 (February 1999): 1–29.
 Lipsitz, George.  The Possessive Investment in Whiteness: How White People Profit from Identity Politics.  Temple University Press, 1998.
 Moore, Shirley Ann Wilson.  To Place Our Deeds: The African American Community in Richmond, California, 1910–1963.  University of California Press, 2000.
 Orser, W. Edward.  “Secondhand Suburbs: Black Pioneers in Baltimore’s Edmondson Village, 1955–1980.”  Journal of Urban History 10, no. 3 (May 1990): 227–62.
 O’ Mara, Margaret Pugh.  “Suburbia Reconsidered: Race, Politics, and Prosperity in the Twentieth Century.”  Journal of Social History 39, no. 1 (Fall 2005): 229–44.
 Pattillo-McCoy, Mary.  Black Pickett Fences: Privilege and Peril among the Black Middle Class.  University of Chicago Press, 1999.
 Self, Robert O.  American Babylon: Race and the Struggle for Postwar Oakland.  Princeton University Press, 2003.
 Sugrue, Thomas J.  The Origins of the Urban Crisis: Race and Inequality in Postwar Detroit.  Princeton University Press, 1996.
 Taylor, Jr., Henry L.  “The Building of a Black Industrial Suburb: The Lincoln Heights, Ohio.”  Thesis, State University of New York at Buffalo, 1979.
 Vicino, Thomas J. Transforming Race and Class in Suburbia: Decline in Metropolitan Baltimore. New York: Palgrave Macmillan, 2008.
 Weise, Andrew.  Places of Their Own: African American Suburbanization in the Twentieth Century.  Chicago: The University of Chicago Press, 2004.
 Weise, Andrew.  “Black Housing, White Finance: African American Housing and Home Ownership in Evanston, Illinois, before 1940.”  Journal of Social History 33, no. 2 (Winter 1999): 429–60.
 Weise, Andrew.  “Places of Our Own: Suburban Black Towns before 1960.”  Journal of Urban History 19, no. 3 (1993): 30–54.
 Wilson, William H.  Hamilton Park: A Planned Black Community in Dallas.  Baltimore: Johns Hopkins University Press, 1998.

Environment and geography
 Blake, Peter.  God’s Own Junkyard: The Planned Deterioration of America’s Landscape.  New York: Holt, Rinehart and Winston, 1964.
 Jindrich, Jason, “Suburbs in the City: Reassessing the Location of Nineteenth-Century American Working-Class Suburbs,” Social Science History, 36 (Summer 2012), 147–67.
 Kunstler, James Howard. The Geography of Nowhere:  The Rise and Decline of America's Man-Made Landscape. Simon and Schuster, 1993.
 Rome, Adam Ward.  The Bulldozer in the Countryside: Suburban Sprawl and the Rise of American Environmentalism.  New York: Cambridge University Press, 2001.
 Winkler, Robert. Going Wild: Adventures with Birds in the Suburban Wilderness. Washington, D.C.: National Geographic, 2003.

Politics
 Dreir, Peter, John Mollenkopf, and Todd Swanstrom.  Place Matters: Metropolitics for the Twenty-first Century.  University of Kansas Press, 2002.
 Gans, Herbert J.  The Levittowners:  Ways of Life and Politics in a New Suburban Community.  New York:  Pantheon, 1967.
 Lassiter, Matthew D.  "The New Suburban History II: Political Culture and Metropolitan Space.”  Journal of Planning History 4, no. 1 (February 2005): 75–88.
 Lassiter, Matthew D.  The Silent Majority: Suburban Politics in the Sunbelt South.  Princeton, N.J: Princeton University Press, 2006.
 Lassiter, Matthew D.  “Suburban Strategies: The Volatile Center in Postwar Politics.”  In The Democratic Experiment: New Directions in American Political History, edited by Meg Jacobs, William J. Novak, and Julian E. Zelizer, 327–49.  Princeton: Princeton University Press, 2003.
 McGirr, Lisa.  Suburban Warriors: The Origins of the New American Right.  Princeton University Press, 2001.
 Oliver, J. Eric.  Democracy in Suburbia.  Princeton University Press, 2001.
 Teaford, Jon C. City and Suburb: The Political Fragmentation of Metropolitan America, 1850–1970.  Baltimore: Johns Hopkins University Press, 1979.
 Vicino, Thomas J. Suburban Crossroads: The Fight for Local Control of Immigration Policy.  Lanham, MD: Lexington Books, 2013.

Historiography
 Archer, John; Paul J.P. Sandul, and Katherine Solomonson (eds.), Making Suburbia: New Histories of Everyday America. Minneapolis, MN: University of Minnesota Press, 2015.
 Ebner, Michael H. "Re-Reading Suburban America: Urban Population Deconcentration, 1810-1980," American Quarterly (1985) 37#3 pp. 368-381 in JSTOR
 Kruse, Kevin M, and Thomas J. Sugrue, editors.  The New Suburban History. Chicago:  University of Chicago Press, 2006.
 McManus, Ruth, and Philip J. Ethington, "Suburbs in transition: new approaches to suburban history," Urban History, Aug 2007, Vol. 34 Issue 2, pp 317–337
 McShane, Clay. "The State of the Art in North American Urban History," Journal of Urban History (2006) 32#4 pp 582–597, identifies a loss of influence by such writers as Lewis Mumford, Robert Caro, and Sam Warner, a continuation of the emphasis on narrow, modern time periods, and a general decline in the importance of the field. Comments by Timothy Gilfoyle and Carl Abbott contest the latter conclusion.
 Nickerson, Michelle. "Beyond Smog, Sprawl, and Asphalt: Developments in the Not-So-New Suburban History," Journal of Urban History (2015) 41#1 pp 171–180. covers 1934 to 2011. DOI: 10.1177/0096144214551724.
 Seligman, Amanda I.  “The New Suburban History”.  Journal of Planning History 3, no. 4 (November 2004): 312–33.
 Shumsky, Larry. Encyclopedia of Urban America: The Cities and Suburbs (2 vol 1998)
 Sies, Mary Corbin. "Beyond Scholarly Orthodoxies in North American Suburban History", Journal of Urban History 27, no. 3 (March 2001): 355–61.
 Vicino, Thomas J. "The political history of a postwar suburban society revisited." History Compass (2008) 6#1 pp: 364–388. online

 
 
Urban areas
Populated places by type

Bibliographies of subcultures